Mouchette is a 1967 French film directed by Robert Bresson, starring Nadine Nortier and Jean-Claude Guilbert. It is based on the novel of the same name by Georges Bernanos. Bresson explained his choice of the novel saying, "I found neither psychology or analysis in it. The substance of the book seemed usable. It could be sieved." It was entered into the 1967 Cannes Film Festival, winning the OCIC Award (International Catholic Organization for Cinema and Audiovisual).

A coming-of-age story, Mouchette is set in a rural French village and follows the daughter of a bullying alcoholic father and ailing mother. Unfolding in the director's famously sparse and minimalist style, Bresson said that its titular character "offers evidence of misery and cruelty. She is found everywhere: wars, concentration camps, tortures, assassinations."

Mouchette is among Bresson's more acclaimed films. The Criterion Collection DVD release includes a trailer for the film made by Jean-Luc Godard.
The Artificial Eye DVD release includes a 29 minute documentary filmed on set about the making of the film.

Plot
Mouchette, whose name means "little fly," lives in an isolated French village with her alcoholic father and bedridden, dying mother, taking care of her infant brother and doing all the housework. She is ostracized at school for her bedraggled clothes and chastised by her teacher for refusing to sing.

Once, in contrast to the misery of her daily life, Mouchette goes to a fair, where a kind woman buys Mouchette a token so she can ride on the bumper cars. She and a young man bump into each other's cars as a mutual flirtation. Before she can speak to the boy after the ride, her father takes Mouchette away.

Walking home from school one day, Mouchette gets lost in the woods when a rainstorm begins. Arsène, an alcoholic epileptic poacher, stumbles upon her and takes her to his hut. He fears he has killed a man with whom he had fought earlier and attempts to use Mouchette as an alibi to clear him of the blame. After she agrees to repeat the story he gives her, Mouchette tries to leave but Arsène blocks her way, chases her down, and rapes her. By early morning, Mouchette has escaped. Returning home and finding her mother's condition worsening, she attempts to comfort her, but she soon dies. On her way to get milk, a shopkeeper offers her a free coffee and croissant. The shopkeeper notices a scratch on Mouchette’s chest and when Mouchette seems to deliberately break the coffee bowl, calls her a "little slut." Elderly women dressed in black are going to church.

Later, when talking to the gamekeeper Mathieu and his wife about the events of the previous night in the woods, she tries to offer the story agreed with Arsène. Reluctantly, she states that she was at Arsène's house through the night because he is her lover. Finally, she is invited into the house of an elderly woman, who gives her a dress to wear at the funeral and a shroud to cover her mother. The woman speaks to her about worshiping the dead and gives Mouchette three nice dresses that will fit. On her way out, Mouchette insults her and damages her carpet. Mouchette then witnesses several hunters shooting and killing rabbits.  Another rabbit is wounded and cannot hop.  Mouchette then walks up a small hill and takes one of the three dresses to try it on, but a branch catches on and tears a hole through it. There is an establishing shot of a stream that returns at the very end of the film.

The film cuts to Mouchette rolling down a hill with the now dirty and ragged dress wrapped around her. Mouchette quickly gets up at the sound of a tractor and waves to the man driving it. He seems too far away to see her. Oddly, she does not cry out to him to get his attention. She turns back and rolls down again out of frame and stops in-frame at the bank of the stream, near the flowers we saw earlier. The camera lingers on the flowers while she returns to the top of the hill and rolls downhill a third and final time. There is a splash at the end of the second shot. It is revealed that Mouchette has disappeared. Classical music echoes the music at the beginning and continues as the film fades to black.

Cast
Besides his preference for non-professional actors, Bresson liked to cast actors he had never used before. The one major exception is Jean-Claude Guilbert, who had the role of Arnold in Au hasard Balthazar, and plays Arsène in this film.

Reception
In 1967, Mouchette won the OCIC Award (International Catholic Organization for Cinema and Audiovisual) at the Cannes Film Festival, and the Pasinetti Award at the Venice Film Festival.

The "critics consensus" at the review aggregator website Rotten Tomatoes states: "Remarkable not only as a viewing experience, but as a showcase for Robert Bresson's tremendous skill, Mouchette underpins its grim narrative with devastating grace." In The Spectator, the critic Penelope Houston highlighted the excellence of Nadine Nortier's performance as Mouchette, writing that, as a consequence, "the whole film becomes luminous, transparent, bafflingly effortless", resulting in "a kind of perfection". Noting the lack of sentimentality or sadism in Bresson's portrayal of Mouchette's suffering, Houston writes that "Mouchette is not a child for anyone's pity, except, in both senses, her creator's." She concludes that "Like Au Hasard, Balthazar, Mouchette is a deeply pessimistic film which somehow leaves one in a mood close to exhilaration. It is conceived, if you like, as a religious experience in which the heroine is not a saint, and in which there is no conventional religious reference."

Mouchette is considered by many critics to be among Bresson's better films. The Swedish director Ingmar Bergman reportedly praised and loved the film. Russian film-maker Andrei Tarkovsky listed the film as one of the ten favorite movies of all time.
Sight & Sound's critics’ poll placed Mouchette in its top 20 in 1972, and in the magazine's 2012 poll of the greatest films of all time Mouchette placed 107th in the directors' poll and 117th in the critics' poll.

References

External links
 
 
 
 Mouchette in Cine y Revolución (Spanish)
Mouchette: Girl, Interrupted an essay by Robert Polito at the Criterion Collection

1967 films
Films directed by Robert Bresson
1967 drama films
Existentialist films
1960s French-language films
French black-and-white films
Films based on works by Georges Bernanos
Films produced by Anatole Dauman